Justice Vincent Thambinayagam Thamotheram (12 October 1915 – 25 October 1997) was a Sri Lankan lawyer, judge and writer. He was a crown counsel, Commissioner of Assize and Supreme Court judge.

Early life and family
Thamotheram was born on 12 October 1915. He was the son of Gate Mudaliyar N. N. Thamotheram. He was educated at Jaffna Central CollegeSt. Thomas' College. After school he entered Ceylon University College and graduated with a BA degree. He then joined Ceylon Law College and passed out as an advocate.

Thamotheram married Baladevi, daughter of Kanagasabai. They had a son, Nirmal Nandakumar, and three daughters, Vasantha, Chandira and Manjula.

Career
Thamotheram was called to the bar in 1942. He joined the Attorney-General's Department. He was a crown counsel from 1944 to 1968. He acted as Solicitor General. He was also appointed Commissioner of Assize. He was appointed Supreme Court judge in 1970. He served on the Judicial Service Commission. He retired in 1980.

Later life
After the Black July riots in which thousands of Sri Lankan Tamils were murdered by Sinhalese mobs, Thamotheram moved to Australia in 1983. He was called to the bar in Australia in 1984.

Thamotheram died in Noble Park, Victoria on 25 October 1997, at the age of 82.

References

1915 births
1997 deaths
Alumni of Ceylon Law College
Alumni of Jaffna Central College
Alumni of S. Thomas' College, Mount Lavinia
Alumni of the Ceylon University College
Australian people of Sri Lankan Tamil descent
Ceylonese advocates
People from Northern Province, Sri Lanka
Puisne Justices of the Supreme Court of Sri Lanka
Sri Lankan emigrants to Australia
Sri Lankan Tamil judges
Sri Lankan Tamil lawyers
Sri Lankan Tamil writers